Tahmuras or Tahmures (from Avestan Taxma Urupi, meaning strong fox) was the third Shah of the Pishdadian dynasty of Iran (Persia) according to Ferdowsi's epic poem, the Shahnameh. He is considered the builder of Merv.

Tahmuras in the Shahnameh
Tahmures was the son of Hushang.  In his time the world was much troubled by the divs (demons) of Ahriman.  On the advice of his vizier Shahrasp, Tahmuras used magic to subdue Ahriman and made him his slave, even riding upon his back as on a horse. The demons rebelled against Tahmuras, and he made war against them with both magic and force. By magic he bound two-thirds of the demons; the remaining third he crushed with his mace. The deevs now became Tahmuras's slaves and they taught him the art of writing in thirty different scripts.

Like his father, Tahmuras was a great inventor of arts for easing the human condition.  He invented the spinning and weaving of wool, learned to domesticate chickens, how to store up fodder for livestock instead of merely grazing them, and how to train animals like dogs and falcons to hunt for people.

Tahmuras ruled for thirty years and was succeeded by his son Jamshid.

Death of Taxmoras, as told in a Parsi Rivayāt
Georges Dumézil provides a summary of a bawdy and scatological, but nonetheless instructive account of the death of Taxmoruw (Tahmuras) preserved in a Parsi rivayāt, translated by Danish orientalist and historian Arthur Christensen and published by Friedrich von Spiegel. This (admittedly late) text furnishes material that Dumézil considers to preserve archaic Indo-European themes with a bearing on what he termed the problem of le borgne and le manchot i.e. of 'the one-eyed (god)' and 'the one-handed (god)' - relating, in this instance, specifically to the mythic motif of one-handedness.

The scene for this scurrilous episode is set by the account in the Avesta of the reign of Taxma Urupi, which relates that this sovereign of the world subdued not only demons and sorcerers, but also the archfiend Angra Mainyu himself, thanks to the help of the wind god Vayu and his (Taxma Urupi's) possession of the khvarenah or mystic 'kingly glory'. Thus empowered, the valiant king is able to ride Angra Mainyu, like a horse, 'from one end of the earth to the other', every day for thirty years. (At this point the Avesta falls silent and the Parsi rivayât takes up the story). Ahriman (Angra Mainyu), exasperated by his undignified bondage as a beast of burden, manages finally to win (by means of a gift of jewellery) the confidence of Taxmoruw's wife, from whom he learns that there is a certain point on the daily ride - a particularly treacherous part of a mountain track - at which Taxmoruw experiences a moment of vertiginous dread. The following day Ahriman bides his time until 'horse' and rider reach the critical point - at which he seizes his chance, rearing up, throwing Taxmoruw to the ground and swallowing the unfortunate king whole. Time passes, but Taxmoruw's corpse is not found, remaining in Ahriman's belly.

Meanwhile, Jamshid, Taxmoruw's devoted brother (not son, as in the Shahnameh), scours the world in search of his body until eventually he learns from Srosh, the well-nigh omniscient confidant of Ahura Mazda, that it is hidden in Ahriman's bowels. Jamshid begs Srosh to tell him some magical trick to retrieve the body from its unsavoury resting place, whereupon Srosh reveals that Ahriman loves two things above all else : music and anal sex. Acting on Srôsh's advice, Jamshid then travels to the area where Ahriman is living and begins to sing. Attracted by the music, the demon duly appears and begins capering about and masturbating in anticipation of his other favourite activity.

Jamshid agrees to penetrate Ahriman on condition that he first be allowed to remove Taxmoruw's body from the demon's bowels. The excited Ahriman agrees readily to the bargain and bends over, presenting his anus, whereupon Jamshid plunges his hand up the demon's rectum, deep into his belly, quickly pulls out his brother's corpse, places it on the ground and flees. Ahriman gives chase, but Jamshid runs on and on, taking care (as instructed previously by Srosh) not to look back at his pursuer and, more especially not to look him in the face. Ahriman tires and, baulked of both pleasure and prey, descends once more into hell.

Jamshid then returns to the spot where he left Taxmoruw's body, constructs the prototypical Tower of Silence and places the body on it for excarnation by birds of prey, in the manner still considered ritually correct by Zoroastrians to this day. Thankful that he has at last been able to give his brother a fitting funeral, Jamshid can finally take time to glance at the hand which has been up Ahriman's anus and sees, to his horror, that it is pale and stinking, starting to waste away with a foul disease similar to leprosy. The disease grows steadily worse, the hand withering and growing ever more painful, and Jamshid becomes sad at his deformity, shunning human society and haunting, hermit-like, the loneliest of mountains and deserts. All, however, ends happily, for one night, as the wretched man lies asleep, an ox urinates on his blighted hand, healing it. Thus comes about the discovery of gōmēz - cattle urine, considered as the purificatory liquid par excellence in Zoroastrianism and used as such in the nine-night ritual of Barashnûm, (as detailed in the 9th chapter of the Vendidad).

Takhmurup and the Three Sacred Fires in the Bundahishn
According to verses 8–9 of the eighteenth chapter of the cosmological treatise known as the Bundahishn, the three preeminent Atar (Great Fires) of ancient Iran—Farnbag, Gushnasp and Burzin Mihr—were brought thither on the back of the ox Srishok from a place named Khwaniratha, during the reign of the primordial ruler Takhmurup—presumably with his knowledge and possibly at his command. The text of the Bundahishn is not easy to interpret at this point, but seems to mean that a group of  men were riding beside the (Caspian?) sea on the back of the ox, transporting with them a fire altar, upon which were burning the three atar (holy fires). A storm then sprang up and the wind whipped the fire altar off Srishok's back and carried it out to sea. The three holy fires, however, were not quenched but miraculously remained burning on the waters, lighting the men (or passing seafarers?) to their (unspecified) destination. The unusual concept of fire burning in the midst of water is found also in relation to the ancient Indo-Iranian deity Apam Napat and both occurrences of the mythological motif may owe something to early observation of flames (derived from the welling up of natural hydrocarbons) hovering near the surface of the Caspian Sea—more specifically the Southwestern part, exploited currently by the Absheron gas field near Baku in Azerbaijan.

Erection of Shiraz
According to certain Iranian traditions, the city of Shiraz was originally built by Tahmures. Some native writers have claimed that the name Shiraz is derived from that of Tahmuras's son.

See also
 Teimuraz (name)

References

Textiles in folklore
Mythological kings
Pishdadian dynasty
Mythological city founders